Nicholas Royle (born 20 March 1963 in Manchester) is an English novelist, editor, publisher, literary reviewer and creative writing lecturer.

Literary career

Author
Royle has written seven novels: Counterparts, Saxophone Dreams, The Matter of the Heart, The Director’s Cut, Antwerp, Regicide and First Novel.  He also claims to have written more than 100 short stories, which have appeared in a variety of anthologies and magazines, including Bad Idea, with his short story Confessions of a Serial Coat Snatcher appearing in the 2008 Bad Idea Anthology. He has written two short-story collections: Mortality and Ornithology.

Awards
Royle has won a British Fantasy Award three times: Best Anthology in 1992 and 1993 and Best Short Story in 1993. He has been nominated for Best Short Story three further times.

The Matter of the Heart won the Bad Sex in Fiction Award in 1997.

Editor
As an editor, Royle is best known for having edited The Lighthouse, by Alison Moore, which was shortlisted for the 2012 Man Booker Prize, and The Many by Wyl Menmuir, which was longlisted for the 2016 Man Booker Prize.

He has also edited more than two dozen anthologies including A Book of Two Halves, The Tiger Garden: A Book of Writers’ Dreams, The Time Out Book of New York Short Stories, and Dreams Never End (Tindal Street Press) and several other novels. He has been series editor of ‘Best British Short Stories’ (Salt) since it launched in 2011.

Publisher
Royle owns and manages Nightjar Press, which publishes short stories as signed, limited edition, chapbooks. Nightjar Press has published authors including M. John Harrison, Christopher Kenworthy, Joel Lane, Alison Moore and Michael Marshall Smith

Academic career
Royle was a Senior Lecturer and then Reader at the Manchester Writing School at Manchester Metropolitan University  From 2006 to 2022 and was Chair of Judges for the Manchester Fiction Prize from its launch in 2009 until he left the university in 2022.

Bibliography

Novels
 Counterparts  (1995 –  [UK], Penguin )
 Saxophone Dreams (1996 –  [UK], Penguin)
 The Matter of the Heart (1997 –  [UK], Abacus)
 The Director’s Cut (2001 –  [UK], Abacus)
 Antwerp (2005 –  [UK], Serpent's Tail)
 Regicide (2011 –  [UK], Serpent's Tail)
 First Novel (2013 –  [UK], Jonathan Cape)

Novellas
 The Enigma of Departure (2008 –  [UK], PS Publishing)
 The Appetite (2008 –  [UK], Gray Friar Press)

Short story collections
 Mortality (2011 –  [UK], Serpent's Tail)
 Ornithology (2017 –  [UK], Confingo)
 The Dummy & Other Uncanny Stories (2018 –  [IRE], Swan River Press)
 London Gothic (2020 –  [UK], Confingo)

Non-fiction
 White Spines: Confessions of a Book Collector (2021 –  [UK], Salt Publishing)

Personal life
Royle has two children and lives in both Manchester and London.

Royle shares his name with a Professor of English at the University of Sussex (born 1957) who is an authority on Jacques Derrida, and the author of textbooks, including The Uncanny, and a novel, Quilt. The two writers are often confused with each other.

Notes

External links

Interview with 3:AM

21st-century English novelists
21st-century British short story writers
Writers from Manchester
1963 births
Living people
Academics of Manchester Metropolitan University
English male novelists
21st-century English male writers
English horror writers